Aphalara is a genus of jumping plant lice (psyllid) in the family Aphalaridae.

Species 
The following are inluded in Psyl'list:
 Aphalara affinis
 Aphalara avicularis
 Aphalara borealis
 Aphalara calthae
 Aphalara confusa
 Aphalara curta
 Aphalara dentata
 Aphalara exilis
 Aphalara fasciata
 Aphalara freji
 Aphalara grandicula
 Aphalara hedini
 Aphalara itadori
 Aphalara jungsukae
 Aphalara loca
 Aphalara loginovae
 Aphalara longicaudata
 Aphalara maculata
 Aphalara maculipennis
 Aphalara manitobaensis
 Aphalara monticola
 Aphalara nigra
 Aphalara nigrimaculosa
 Aphalara nubifera
 Aphalara ossiannilssoni
 Aphalara pauli
 Aphalara persicaria
 Aphalara polygoni
 Aphalara purpurascens
 Aphalara rumicis
 Aphalara sauteri
 Aphalara simila
 Aphalara steironemicola
 Aphalara tecta
 Aphalara ulicis

 Names brought to synonymy
 Aphalara elegans De Bergevin, 1932, a synonym for Colposcenia elegans (Bergevin, 1932)

References

External links

Aphalaridae
Psylloidea genera